

Introduction 

Proenkephalin (PENK), formerly known as proenkephalin A (since proenkephalin B was renamed prodynorphin), is an endogenous opioid polypeptide hormone which, via proteolyic cleavage, produces the enkephalin peptides [Met]enkephalin, and to a lesser extent, [Leu]enkephalin. Upon cleavage, each proenkephalin peptide results in the generation of four copies of [Met]enkephalin, two extended copies of [Met]enkephalin, and one copy of [Leu]enkephalin. Contrarily, [Leu]enkephalin] is predominantly synthesized from prodynorphin, which produces three copies of it per cleavage, and no copies of [Met]enkephalin. Other endogenous opioid peptides produced by proenkephalin include adrenorphin, amidorphin, BAM-18, BAM-20P, BAM-22P, peptide B, peptide E, and peptide F.

Proenkephalin in human diseases 
Proenkephalin is produced by the medium spiny neurons of the striatum which undergo neurodegeneration in early stages of Huntingtons disease (HD). PENK and related peptides measured in cerebrospinal fluid are proposed as potential biomarkers of disease progression in HD.

See also 

 Prodynorphin (Proenkephalin B)
 Proopiomelanocortin (POMC)

References

External links 
 

Opioids
Neuropeptides
Precursor proteins